Mombasa Terminus is a railway station on the Mombasa–Nairobi Standard Gauge Railway located in Mombasa. The station is located in a suburb of Mombasa called Miritini. The architecture of the station building is made up of concentric circles and a central tower, representing a ripple in the ocean.

Two passenger trains leave the station everyday, an inter-county train that stops at all stations and an express train that goes directly to Nairobi Terminus.

References

Railway stations in Kenya
Railway stations opened in 2017
Buildings and structures in Mombasa